Devarajan (Dave) Thirumalai, an Indian-born American physicist, is the Collie-Welch Reagents Professor in Chemistry at the University of Texas at Austin. He researches equilibrium and non-equilibrium statistical mechanics, such as the transition from liquid to
amorphous state, polymer-colloid interactions, and protein and RNA folding. He isnotedfor his contributions to the theories of protein/RNA folding, protein aggregation, glasses (the Random First Order Transition – RFOT theory), and biological machines. He has also researched intrinsically disordered proteins (IDPs), organization and dynamics of chromosome and cell biophysics. Prior to moving to the University of Texas at Austin, he was a distinguished university professor in the University of Maryland from 2010 to 2015.

Educational Background
Dave Thirumalai studied at the Indian Institute of Technology, Kanpur where he earned a MSc degree (1977).  He earned his doctorate degree in 1982 from the University of Minnesota under Donald G. Truhlar.

Academic career
After postdoctoral studies at the Columbia University in New York City, he joined University of Maryland as an assistant Professor of Physics in 1985. He is the founding director of the biophysics program in the University of Maryland. In 2016, he joined the University of Texas at Austin as the Collie-Welch Reagents Chair.

Awards and honors
1986–1988 Alfred P. Sloan Fellowship.
1987–1992 Presidential Young Investigator Award.
2009 Humboldt Research Award for Senior U.S. Scientists.
2009 Fellow of the Royal Society of Chemistry.
2011 Honorary Senior Hans-Fisher Fellow.
2014 Fellow of the Biophysical Society.
2015 Fellow of the American Physical Society.
2016 Chemical Research Society of India (CRSI) Medal.
2016 ACS Theoretical Chemistry Award.
2018 Oesper Award, Chemistry, University of Cincinnati.
2019 APS Award, Irving Langmuir Prize.
2019 Hans Neurath Award, Protein Society.

References

Living people
21st-century American physicists
Indian expatriate academics
Indian expatriates in the United States
Fellows of the Royal Society of Chemistry
20th-century American physicists
Fellows of the American Physical Society

Year of birth missing (living people)
American biophysicists